Desperate Housewives Africa, also known as Desperate HWA, is a Nigerian comedy-drama-mystery television series Pan-African version of the American television series, Desperate Housewives created by Marc Cherry and produced by ABC Studios, that premiered on Ebony Life TV on 30 April 2015. The show features an ensemble cast, which includes: Joseph Benjamin, Kehinde Bankole, Omotu Bissong, Nini Wacera, Michelle Dede, Marcy Dolapo Oni and Linda Osifo.

The show was shot in Lekki. It is a Pan-African adaptation of the American series, Desperate Housewives, that aired from 2004 to 2012; the show has been minimally adapted to African themes; from character names to the main plot, but the main characters play the same roles as the characters in the original version.

Plot
A look at the seemingly normal suburban lives of African women as they seek to live out their aspirations through their families, career and relationships, set in the middle-class development on Hibiscus Lane on the Lekki Peninsula in Lagos.
It begins with the shocking suicide of Rume Bello (Mary Alice Young); a beautiful housewife, known for her warmth and generosity. In death, Rume delves into the lives of the friends she left behind – commenting from her now elevated perspective. Her intimate circle of friends who are confused by her death, are introduced.
Tari Gambadia (Susan Mayer) who is divorced, single-mother looking for love; Funke Lawal (Lynette Scavo) a corporate high-achiever turned stay-at-home mum of four children who create a huge scene at Rume Bello's wake seriously embarrassing her; Ese De Souza (Bree Van de Kamp), a devout and perfectly groomed housewife and mother of two teenagers, who is dealing with the outcome of her family's rejection of her façade and standards; Kiki Obi (Gabrielle Solis), ex Nollywood actress and trophy wife whose marriage to the rising movie financier Chuka Obi (Carlos Solis) fails to satisfy her deepest needs, and she turns to her personal trainer, Tai Etim (John Rowland) to alleviate her boredom.
We are also introduced to the neighbours on the Lane including Rhetta Moore (Edie Britt) a twice-divorced real estate broker with a voracious sexual appetite, who aggressively competes with Tari for the affections of handsome newcomer, Larry Izama (Mike Delfino) who we later discover came to Hibiscus Lane with a hidden agenda. Tensions rise as Kay De Souza (Rex Van de Kamp) asks his wife Ese for a divorce; Chuka Obi treats his wife Kiki like she is on his payroll; Shina Lawal (Tom Scavo) is oblivious to his wife's frustration and growing desperation; Deji Bello (Paul Young), Rume's now widowed husband, seems to express his grief by suspiciously digging up his garden.
Rume narrates the series from her vantage point, giving an insight into the lives, mysteries and conflicts of these four intriguing women.

Cast
 Michelle Dede as Tari Gam
 Omotu Bissong as Funke Lawal
 Nini Wacera as Ese De Souza
 Kehinde Bankole as Kiki Obi 
 Linda Osifo as Rhetta Moore
 Mercy Dolapo Oni as Rume Bello
 Nonso Odogwu as Kayonde De Souza
 Femi Branch as Deji Bello
 Joseph Benjamin as Chuka Obi 
 Jason Dwoga as Larry Izama
 Susan Pwajok as Aisha Gambandia
 Ben Touitou as Tai Etim
 Ifeanyi Dike, Jr as Leo De Souza 
 Ozzy Agu as Shina Lawal
 Omolara Akinsola as Esther Benson
 Moyosore Okisola as Tobi Lawal
 Emmanuel Osawaru as Tope Lawal
 Imolejesu Noah as Tola Lawal
 Esther Ubong-Abasi as Katherine De Souza
Shaffy Bello as Agnes Bassey
 Blossom Chukwujekwu as Lekan Phillips
 Carol King as Abike Haastrup
 Lemmi Ilemona Adejo as Solomon Haastrup
 Katung Musa Aduwak as Dunlandi Gambadia
 Samuel Robinson as Akin Bello
Tina Mba as Furo George 
 Amaka Anioji as Nnena Okafor
 Ayo Liyado as Father Ajayi
 Nicole Vervelde Keza as Amanda
 Faith Emmanuel as Bose
Gregory Ojefua as Private Investigator

Production 
Auditions for various roles were announced in December 2013. Mo Abudu the CEO and executive producer led the production. Directed by Quinty Pillay, the cast members were mainly from Nigeria. The names of the cast were changed from names in the original show, in order to have African names. Michelle Dede plays Susan Mayer while Nini Wacera a Kenyan actress plays the adapted version of Bree Van de Kamp, as Kehinde Bankole plays Gabrielle Solis.Omotu Bissong plays Lynette Scavo, Mercy Dolapo Oni plays of Mary Alice Young and Linda Osifo plays Edie Britt.

The husbands that depicted the original version were, Joseph Benjamin playing African version of Carlos Solis, Larry Izama plays Mike Delphino, Femi Branch plays Paul Young, Ben Touitou plays African version John Rawland, Ozzy Agu plays Tom Scavo and Samuel Robinson plays Zach Young .

On July 30, 2015, the show went for a production break in order to replenish the remaining nine episode. It took over from September 3, 2015, from the fifteenth episode of the first season.

Broadcast
Desperate Housewives Africa premiered across the African continent and beyond on Ebony Life Television that is available on Multichoice dish, DSTV Channel 165 on 30 April 2015.

General Manager 
 Giovanni Mastrangelo

Created by 
 Marc Cherry

Created and written by
 Marc Cherry

Written By 
 Marc Cherry
 Jason Ganzel
 Jenna Bans
 Joshua Senter
 Dahvi Waller
 Kevin Etten
 Brian Tanen
 Alexandra Cunningham
 Bob Daily
 John Pardee
 Joey Murphy
 Wendy Mericle
 Matt Berry
 Kevin Murphy
 Tom Spezialy
 Jeff Greenstein
 Joe Keenan
 Jamie Gorenberg
 David Flebotte
 Marco Pennette
 David Schladweiler
 Chuck Ranberg
 Anne Flett-Giordano
 Susan Nirah Jaffee
 Chris Black
 Lori Kirkland Baker
 John Paul Bullock III
 Cindy Appel
 Christian McLaughlin
 Peter Lefcourt
 Jeffrey Richman
 Jim Lincoln
 Scott Sanford Tobis
 Valerie Ahern
 Brian A. Alexander
 Patty Lin
 Tracey Stern
 Adam Barr
 Alan Cross
 Katie Ford
 Ellen Herman
 David Schulner
 Oliver Goldstick
 Sheila R. Lawrence
 Valerie Brotski
 Bruce Zimmerman
 Sara Parriott
 Josann McGibbon
 Annie Weisman

Episodes

References

External links

 
Nigerian television soap operas
2015 Nigerian television series debuts
2015 television series endings
English-language television shows
2010s Nigerian television series
Television shows set in Lagos
Non-American television series based on American television series
Television series by ABC Studios
Nigerian television series
Ebonylife TV original programming